Gotho may refer to:

1049 Gotho, asteroid in Asteroid belt
Heinrich Gotho (1872–1938), Austrian film actor
Mbah Gotho (born, reportedly, 1870–2017), Indonesian man who has claimed to be the oldest person